Eurocephalus is a small genus of passerine birds in the shrike family.  Just two species are placed in this genus.

Extant Species

These are large brown and white shrikes found in sub-Saharan Africa. They are gregarious species, unlike the Lanius  shrikes, and have a parrot-like flight.

Eurocephalus shrikes are birds of savanna and open woodland habitats, typically seen perched upright on a prominent thornbush perch. These species primarily take large insects, but will occasionally eat fruit which has fallen to the ground.

The male and female are similar in plumage in both species but are distinguishable from immature birds.

References
 Tony Harris and Kim Franklin, Shrikes and Bush-Shrikes 

 
Shrikes
Bird genera
Laniidae